Valerie Brandy is an American actress, director, and screenwriter. She is best known for her recurring role as Trixie on FX's Justified, and for her performance as Lola in the feature film Lola's Last Letter, which she also wrote and directed. The film premiered at the TCL Chinese Theatre in Hollywood as a competition feature at Dances with Films Festival, and earned Brandy a Best Principal Actress Nomination from the Los Angeles Film Review.

Career
Valerie Brandy had a recurring role in season 3 of Justified as Trixie, a drug addict and informant for the villain Limehouse. Trixie had a family connection to Noble's Holler, as her mother had taken up refuge there. Brandy's story arc on the show ended when her character was shot by Tanner Dodd. Other television and film credits include appearances on Lie to Me, and various independent films.

Brandy's first original feature screenplay Dying with Daisy was a quarterfinalist in the Nicholl Fellowships in Screenwriting, administered by the Academy of Motion Picture Arts and Sciences.

In 2015, Brandy made her directorial debut in the independent feature film Lola's Last Letter, which she also wrote and starred in. The film co-starred Annamarie Kenoyer and Travis Quentin Young. The movie was released in 2016 after its World Premiere at the TCL Chinese Theatre in Hollywood as a Competition Feature at Dances with Films Festival. It was well received by critics, and was given a five star review from the Examiner.

The Huffington Post commented that as a director, "... the key word when describing Brandy is unflinching."   Women & Hollywood chose Lola's Last Letter as a VOD pick of the month, stating in its review that "...If “Orange is the New Black” broke a barrier by shining a spotlight on and humanizing an ignored population — prisoners — then it’s probably safe to say Valerie Brandy does the same thing for ex-cons in her directorial debut."

Valerie was nominated by the Los Angeles Film Review for a Best Principal Actress Award for her role as Lola, and was praised for her directorial ability and performance. Jason Coleman of Starpulse stated that the film was, "...an original and at times heartbreaking drama," and called Brandy's portrayal of Lola, "breathtakingly real and raw... her work utterly unforgettable."

Awards and nominations

References

External links
 
 

American television actresses
American film actresses
American women screenwriters
American women film directors
Year of birth missing (living people)
Living people
21st-century American women